The Orange County Fair is an annual fair held in the town of Wallkill, New York. The fair began when farmers of Orange County organized an agricultural society to help promote a county fair.  In 1808 they tried to organize the fair but it did not generate enough local interest.  The society tried again in 1818 and held the fair until 1825.  It took another sixteen years before county leaders met at the Old Stone Courthouse in Goshen, New York on September 11, 1841 and formed the Orange County Agricultural Society.  That meeting was the birth of the Orange County Fair and the first fair was held on November 17, 1841 in Goshen.

Since that first fair in Goshen, the fair gained in popularity and other communities wanted to host it on a rotating basis.  The fair rotated locations from year to year in Montgomery, NY, Chester, NY, Newburgh, NY, Warwick, NY, Washingtonville, NY, Goshen, NY and Middletown, NY.

In 1862 the fair's permanent site in Goshen was established but by 1872 the fair was in trouble because the lease on that site was not renewed, however, a group of Orange County farmers kept the fair alive in succeeding years.

It was permanently located in the Wallkill–Middletown area in 1897.

There were cancellations in 1917–18, 1942–45 & 2020.

Orange County Fair Speedway

The fairgrounds are also home to the Orange County Fair Speedway, where they hold stock car races and demolition derbies during the summer months. It is the oldest continuously operating dirt track in the United States. In 1919, a group staged an automobile race during the annual fair. The first race was a huge success, and auto racing has been an integral part of the fairgrounds ever since.

4-H And Future Farmers of America

The fair no longer maintains 4-H and Future Farmers of America exhibits,  Future Farmers of America hasn't been a part of the fair for a number of years and in 2012, 4-H pulled out as well.  The fair now brings in private agricultural displays and exotic animals which it considers more friendly to its customers.

Westwood One / Pepsi Concert Series
Through the 1980s and well into the 1990s, the Orange County Fairgrounds hosted the Westwood One & Pepsi Concert Series, featuring some of the biggest names in the music industry every summer. Some of the music acts that appeared through the years included:

References

External links
Orange County Fair
Orange County Fair Speedway
The History of Orange County Fair Speedway

Annual fairs
1843 establishments in New York (state)
Fairs in the United States
Orange County, New York